Wallace is a village in Lincoln County, Nebraska, United States. It is part of the North Platte, Nebraska Micropolitan Statistical Area. The population was 366 at the 2010 census.

History
Wallace was platted in 1887 when the railroad was extended to that point.

Geography
Wallace is located at  (40.838672, -101.164365).

Climate

Demographics

2010 census
As of the census of 2010, there were 366 people, 140 households, and 104 families residing in the village. The racial makeup of the village was 85.5% White, 1.1% Native American, 0.8% Asian, 10.4% from other races, and 2.2% from two or more races. Hispanic or Latino of any race were 17.2% of the population.

There were 140 households, of which 40.7% had children under the age of 18 living with them, 61.4% were married couples living together, 7.1% had a female householder with no husband present, 5.7% had a male householder with no wife present, and 25.7% were non-families. 22.1% of all households were made up of individuals, and 10% had someone living alone who was 65 years of age or older. The average household size was 2.61 and the average family size was 3.09.

The median age in the village was 35.8 years. 30.9% of residents were under the age of 18; 5.2% were between the ages of 18 and 24; 23.2% were from 25 to 44; 24.8% were from 45 to 64; and 15.8% were 65 years of age or older. The gender makeup of the village was 47.0% male and 53.0% female.

2000 census
As of the census of 2000, there were 329 people, 134 households, and 97 families residing in the village. The population density was 467.5 people per square mile (181.5/km). There were 145 housing units at an average density of 206.0 per square mile (80.0/km). The racial makeup of the village was 99.39% White, 0.30% Native American, 0.30% from other races. Hispanic or Latino of any race were 0.61% of the population.

There were 134 households, out of which 32.8% had children under the age of 18 living with them, 64.2% were married couples living together, 3.7% had a female householder with no husband present, and 26.9% were non-families. 26.1% of all households were made up of individuals, and 11.9% had someone living alone who was 65 years of age or older. The average household size was 2.46 and the average family size was 2.95.

In the village, the population was spread out, with 28.9% under the age of 18, 4.6% from 18 to 24, 22.2% from 25 to 44, 24.3% from 45 to 64, and 20.1% who were 65 years of age or older. The median age was 42 years. For every 100 females, there were 86.9 males. For every 100 females age 18 and over, there were 98.3 males.

As of 2000 the median income for a household in the village was $36,771, and the median income for a family was $41,346. Males had a median income of $30,179 versus $19,688 for females. The per capita income for the village was $22,033. About 6.4% of families and 9.5% of the population were below the poverty line, including 18.3% of those under age 18 and none of those age 65 or over.

Local business
 1st State Bank - 1st.BANK

References

External links
 Wallace Fire and Rescue

Villages in Lincoln County, Nebraska
Villages in Nebraska
North Platte Micropolitan Statistical Area